Arisaema yamatense  is a plant species in the family Araceae. It is found in Japan.

References

yamatense
Flora of Japan
Plants described in 1929